Sammezzano, or the Castle of Sammezzano, is an Italian palazzo in Tuscany featuring Moorish Revival architectural style. It is located in Leccio, a hamlet of Reggello, in the Province of Florence.

Description
The original palazzo was erected in about 1605 by the Spanish nobleman Ximenes of Aragon. In the 19th century, Ferdinand Panciatichi Ximenes inherited the property and, between 1853 and 1889, remodeled it into one of the largest examples of Moorish Revival architecture. Umberto I, king of Italy, visited Ximenes at Sammezzano in 1878.

The palazzo served as a luxury hotel in the post World War II era; then was vacated and closed. A committee called FPXA 1813–2013, abbreviation for Ferdinand Panciatichi Ximenes d’Aragon, was organized in 2012 to attempt to restore and preserve the palazzo, which has 365 rooms, each with unique, Moorish decoration.

In music 
Castle of Sammezzano can be seen in the 38 minutes long video - Beyond the Shores (on Death and Dying) - of the band Shores of Null.

References

External links
 
 
 

Castles in Tuscany
Buildings and structures in Reggello
7 Most Endangered Programme
Moorish Revival architecture in Italy
Visionary environments